John Eddowes Bowman the Younger (1819–1854) was an English chemist.

Life
Bowman was the son of John Eddowes Bowman the elder, and brother of Sir William Bowman, physiologist and oculist, born at Welchpool on 7 July 1819. He was a pupil of John Frederic Daniell at King's College, London, and in 1845 succeeded William Allen Miller as demonstrator of chemistry there; he became subsequently, in 1851, the first professor of practical chemistry there. He was one of the founders of the Chemical Society of London. He died on 10 February 1854.

Works
Besides contributions to scientific journals, he published 'A Lecture on Steam Boiler Explosions,' 1845; 'An Introduction to Practical Chemistry' (London, 1848; subsequent editions in 1854, 1858, 1861, 1866, and 1871); and 'A Practical Handbook of Medical Chemistry' (London, 1850, 1852, 1855, and 1862). Later editions of these works were edited by Charles Loudon Bloxam.
 John E. Bowman's An introduction to practical chemistry, including analysis (Philadelphia, 1849).

References

Attribution

1819 births
1854 deaths
English chemists
Alumni of King's College London
Academics of King's College London